Adele Marcus (February 22, 1906  May 3, 1995) was an American pianist and instructor whose career was based at the Juilliard School in New York City.

Life and career
Marcus was born in Kansas City, Missouri, the youngest of 13 children of a rabbi and his wife, who were of Russian descent. When the family moved to Los Angeles, Marcus and her sister Rosamund formed a piano duo, locally known as the Two Prodigies, and were the students of  Desider Josef Vecsei and Alexis Kall. She later studied under Josef Lhévinne and Artur Schnabel in New York City. After winning the Walter W. Naumburg Foundation Award in 1928, she made a series of solo recital debuts in Chicago, San Francisco and New York City. Of her New York debut in 1929, The New York Times wrote: "Last night she displayed distinguished gifts both as a technician and an interpreter."

Marcus taught on the faculty of the Juilliard School in New York City from 1954 to 1990. She also gave master classes in piano performance at other conservatories, including the American Conservatory of Music in Chicago during the 1970s, in collaboration with William Browning, also a teacher of great repute.

Marcus's performances included a Carnegie Hall recital on January 25, 1949, in which she played Scarlatti, Brahms, Schubert, Schumann, Scriabin, Rachmaninoff, Stravinsky and Chopin.

Her students included: Edward Aldwell, Agustin Anievas, Louise Barfield, Tzimon Barto, Enrique Bátiz, David Brunell, Anthony Byrne, Sergio Calligaris, José Carlos Cocarelli, Cy Coleman, Douglas Riva, Stewart L. Gordon, Steven Graff, Horacio Gutiérrez, Stephen Hough, Byron Janis, Soonja Kim, Norman Krieger, Daniel Lessner, Panayis Lyras, Wanda Maximilien, Diana McIntosh, Beata Moon, Pascal Nemirovski, Ken Noda, Jon Kimura Parker, Momoro Ono,  Peter Orth, Jordan Rudess, Neil Sedaka, Daniel Epstein, Dr. Gary de Sesa, Jeffrey Swann, Emma Tahmizian, Jennifer Hayghe, Ezequiel Viñao, Harvey Wedeen, and Clare Element.

Marcus died on May 3, 1995 at her home in Manhattan, aged 89. In 2008, the Juilliard School established the Adele Marcus Piano Scholarship in her honor.

References

Further reading
 Elder, Dean (May–June 1983). "Adele Marcus: World-Class Teacher", Clavier, Vol. 22, No. 5, 
 Kehler, George (1982). "Marcus, Adele", pp. 804–805. The Piano in Concert. Scarecrow Press

External links
Adele Marcus: Grand Dame of the Golden Age of the Piano, curated by pianist Jeffrey Biegel, one of her former students.

1906 births
1995 deaths
American classical pianists
American women classical pianists
Jewish American classical musicians
Jewish classical pianists
Juilliard School faculty
Musicians from Kansas City, Missouri
Piano pedagogues
20th-century classical pianists
20th-century American pianists
20th-century American women pianists
Educators from Missouri
Classical musicians from Missouri
Women music educators
20th-century American Jews